Spider-Man: The Dragon's Challenge is a 1981 American superhero film that had a theatrical release abroad, a composite of the 1979 two-parter episode "The Chinese Web" of the contemporary television series The Amazing Spider-Man, released, theatrically, on 9 May 1981. It was directed by Don McDougall, written by Lionel E. Siegel and stars Nicholas Hammond as the titular character, Rosalind Chao, Robert F. Simon, Benson Fong, and Ellen Bry. It is the sequel to Spider-Man (1977) and Spider-Man Strikes Back (1978).

It was the final Spider-Man film that released theatrical outside of North America, until Columbia Pictures acquired the rights in 1999 from its license, due to licensing and financial issues with Cannon Films, Carolco Pictures and New Cannon, and finally released Spider-Man in 2002.

Plot
Min Lo Chan, the Chinese Minister of Industrial Development, who happens to be an old college friend of J. Jonah Jameson, flees China and comes to the United States to locate three men who during the war approached him and offered him money for secrets about Mao Zedong, which he refused at the time. He stays with his niece Emily Chan, who lives in New York City. However, it appears the incident is now being investigated and he needs to find one of them quickly in order to verify his innocence.

He asks Mr. Jameson to help him find them, but he wants it done quietly because it seems that there are elements who want him convicted, so Jameson asks Peter Parker to find the three ex-Marines on his behalf, but also to talk to them discreetly. Meanwhile, back in Hong Kong, Zeider who is a wealthy industrialist, is among the ones being considered to build a power plant for the Chinese Government worth one billion dollars. However, he knows that Min Lo Chan is considering another company but if he's convicted his successor will award the contract to him. As a result, he sends Clyde Evans to make sure he doesn't return to China alive.

As Spider-Man, Peter saves Min's life several times. However, in one of the murder attempts Min suffers a minor heart attack and has to remain under medical observation. To trick Evans, the Daily Bugle publishes the news stating that Min has died in hospital.

Peter manages to contact the last of the Marines needed to clear Min's name, Professor Dent, who agrees to help as he also wants to clear his name. Along with Peter and Min's niece Emily, Dent flies to Hong Kong to testify, but Zeider has him kidnapped to ensure his silence. During an incident while chasing the kidnappers, Emily discovers that Peter Parker is Spider-Man. Finally, with Emily's help, Spider-Man traces Dent in Zeider's secret office at the top of a building. After defeating all of the henchmen, he captures Zeider and frees Dent. Peter Parker proceeds to return back to the United States as Emily decides to stay in China and promises Peter not to reveal his secret identity.

Cast
Nicholas Hammond – Spider-Man / Peter Parker
Robert F. Simon – J. Jonah Jameson
Rosalind Chao – Emily Chan
Benson Fong – Min Lo Chan
Richard Erdman – Zeider
Ellen Bry – Julie Masters
Chip Fields – Rita Conway
John Milford – Professor Dent
Hagan Beggs – Clyde Evans
George Cheung – Doctor Pai
Ted Danson – Major Collings
Myron Healey – Lieutenant Olson
Anthony Charnota – Quinn
Tony Clark – Joe

Release
The film was theatrically released in European territories on 3 February 1981 and in Australia where it screened at the Pix theatre among others, distributed by Hoyts. It received a VHS release in 1982.

References

External links

1981 action films
Spider-Man films
Films set in New York City
Films shot in Los Angeles
The Amazing Spider-Man (1977 TV and film series)
Sony Pictures films
Columbia Pictures films
1980s English-language films
Films directed by Don McDougall
1980s American films
Live-action films based on Marvel Comics